Chatham—Kent was a provincial electoral district (or riding) in Ontario, Canada. It existed from the 1967 election until it was abolished into Lambton—Kent—Middlesex and Chatham-Kent—Essex in 1998.

From the 1987 election until its abolishment in 1999 the riding included the (now former) municipalities of Dover Township, Chatham Township, Camden Township, Zone Township, the towns of Wallaceburg, Dresden and Bothwell plus the city of Chatham.

Members
Darcy McKeough, Progressive Conservative (1967–1978)
Andrew Naismith Watson, Progressive Conservative (1978–1985)
Maurice Bossy, Liberal (1985–1990)
Randy Hope, New Democratic Party (1990–1995)
Jack Carroll, Progressive Conservative (1995–1999)

Former provincial electoral districts of Ontario